William Whiteman Carlton Topley FRS (19 January 1886 – 21 January 1944) was a British bacteriologist.  He was elected a Fellow of the Royal Society in 1930. He gave the Goulstonian Lectures in 1919 and the Milroy Lectures in 1926. Awarded the Royal Medal in 1942.

References

External links 
http://mansfield.osu.edu/~sabedon/bgnws026.pdf

1886 births
1944 deaths
Alumni of St John's College, Cambridge
Fellows of the Royal Society
Royal Medal winners